The 1999 Giro del Trentino was the 23rd edition of the Tour of the Alps cycle race and was held on 26 April to 29 April 1999. The race started in Lienz and finished in Arco. The race was won by Paolo Savoldelli.

General classification

References

1999
1999 in road cycling
1999 in Italian sport
April 1999 sports events in Europe